The Youth Development Administration (YDA; ;Bopomofo :ㄋㄧㄢˊ ㄈㄚ ㄓㄢˇ ㄕㄨˇ) is a branch of the Ministry of Education of the Republic of China (Taiwan) with a responsibility for youth affairs.

History
It was established on 28 January 1966 as the National Youth Commission (NYC) under the Executive Yuan until 1 January 2013 when it was put under the administration of the Ministry of Education as a result of the reorganization of the Executive Yuan and renamed to Youth Development Administration.

Organizational structure
 Planning and Career Consultant Division
 Public Participation Division
 International and Experiential Learning Division
 Secretariat
 Personnel Office
 Civil Service Ethics Office
 Accounting Office

Transportation
The YDA office building is accessible within walking distance North East from NTU Hospital Station of the Taipei Metro.

See also
 Ministry of Education (Taiwan)

References

行政院青輔會青年職業訓練中心 (NYC website)

1966 establishments in Taiwan
Youth organizations based in Taiwan